Ashton House may refer to a number of buildings.

Ireland
Ashton House, Dublin

United Kingdom
Ashton House, Cumbria

United States
Ashton House (Syracuse, New York)
Ashton House, a building and former student housing cooperative at Swarthmore College